Chris Agos is an American actor. Agos played Apollo 11 astronaut Buzz Aldrin in the Apple TV+ original science fiction space drama series For All Mankind, ASA Steve Kot in Chicago PD on NBC, Eliot McGantry in Boss on Starz, and has had numerous single-episode appearances on television shows such as Grey's Anatomy, House of Cards, and Sirens.

Early life
Agos was born in Joliet, Illinois, the youngest of three. His parents owned and operated fried chicken restaurants in Naperville, Illinois As a boy he attended the Avery Coonley School, a school for academically bright and gifted students. In 2019 he was awarded the school's Distinguished Alumni Award, which recognizes alumni for outstanding leadership in the local, national or global community. In high school Agos was active in drama, appearing in plays and musicals.

Career
Agos began studying voice over acting while attending DePaul University in Chicago as a distraction from medical school entrance exams.  In addition to working in voice over, he began appearing in commercials, corporate projects and print ads before being cast in minor roles in television shows such as The Beast, Cooper and Stone, The Chicago Code, Grey's Anatomy, House of Cards, and Sirens. His first multi-episode arc came in 2011 in Boss. In 2014 he was cast as ASA Steve Kot in Chicago PD, a role he played for nearly three seasons. His character was crossed over to companion show Chicago Fire for four episodes over two seasons. 

Agos was cast in Man of Steel but his performance was cut from the film. Agos gained media attention after being cast as astronaut Buzz Aldrin in For All Mankind, part of the original slate of four shows which launched the Apple TV+ streaming platform. 

Agos is the author of Acting In Chicago: Making a Living Doing Commercials, Voice Overs, TV/Film and More, a guide to the business of acting in the Midwest. He also wrote The Voice Over Startup Guide: How to Land Your First VO Job, a guide to starting a career as a voice actor.

Personal life
Agos and his wife, Patricia, have twin boys.

Filmography

Film

Television

References

External links

Official Website
Acting in Chicago
Complete Voiceover

Male_actors_from_Chicago
American_male_actors
American_male_television_actors
21st-century_American_male_actors